Deepika Thakur  (born 7 February 1987) is an Indian field hockey player and is currently the most senior and highest capped player of Indian women's Team. She plays as a Defender in the senior team and has represented India over 200 outings and has scored 24 goals.

Career
She hails from Haryana and is a product of Sports Hostel, Chandigarh. She works for Indian Railways. She has represented India in World Cup 2006 and 2010, Asian Games in 2010, 2014 and 2018 and Commonwealth Games in  2010 and 2014.

Deepika joined the Indian National Women's hockey team much against the wishes of her parents who wanted her to marry early. She postponed her marriage that was scheduled to happen in October 2016 in order to play for the 2016 Summer Olympics. Indian women's team qualified for the Rio Olympics 2016 after the gap of 36 years. Deepika was the vice-captain of that squad. Though India finished bottom of the group.

In the Asian Champions Trophy (2016) held in Malaysia, Indian  women's won their maiden title in which Deepika played an important role. She also got the ‘highest scorer of the tournament’ award.

India won gold medal at the South Asian Games, 2016. Deepika was part of the squad and scored one of the goals in the final match against Sri Lanka.

Achievements
 250 Match caps Milestone
 Asian Games 2018 (Jakarta- Indonesia) – Silver Medal 
 5th Asian Champian Trophy, Korea (2018) – Silver Medal
 Women Hockey World League Semifinal ( Vencouver- Canada) 2017 - Winner
 4th Asian Champion Trophy (Singapore) (2016) – Gold Medal
 12th SAF games (Guwahati – India) 2016 – Gold Medal 
 FIH World League Round 2 (Delhi- India) 2015 - Winner
 Test match series India V/s Spain (Valencia- Spain)  2015 - Winner
 Test Series (Rome-Italy) 2014 - Winner
 17th Asian games (Incheon-Korea) 2014 – Bronze Medal
 8th Women Asia Cup (Malaysia) 2013 – Bronze Medal
 3rd Asian Championship (Gifu-Japan)  2013 – Silver Medal 
 FIH Olympic Qualifying Tournament (New Delhi-India) 2012- Silver Medal
 Test Match Series India v/s Azerbaizan (New Delhi -India) 2012- Winner 
 Test Match Series (Australia) 2011 – 2nd Place
 1st Asian Champion Trophy (Busan-Korea) 2010 – Bronze Medal
 4 Nations Tournament (Germany)2010 – Bronze Medal
 7th Asia Cup (Bangkok- Thailand) 2009 – Silver Medal
 Champion Challenge II (Kazan-Russia) 2009 - Gold Medal

Awards and honours
 Member of selection Committee Khelo India 2021
 High Performance manager (Hockey) From Sports Authority of India
 Arjuna Award 2020 (Hockey)
 Dhruv Batra Player of the Year, Women (2015) in Hockey.
 Hockey India Defender of the year 2014
 GM Railways Award 2008

See also
List of Indian sportswomen

References

External links

1987 births
Living people
Indian female field hockey players
21st-century Indian women
21st-century Indian people
Asian Games medalists in field hockey
Asian Games silver medalists for India
Asian Games bronze medalists for India
Female field hockey defenders
Field hockey players at the 2010 Asian Games
Field hockey players at the 2014 Asian Games
Field hockey players at the 2016 Summer Olympics
Field hockey players at the 2018 Asian Games
Field hockey players from Haryana
Medalists at the 2014 Asian Games
Medalists at the 2018 Asian Games
Olympic field hockey players of India
Sportswomen from Haryana
Recipients of the Arjuna Award
Field hockey players at the 2010 Commonwealth Games
Field hockey players at the 2014 Commonwealth Games
Field hockey players at the 2018 Commonwealth Games
Commonwealth Games competitors for India
South Asian Games gold medalists for India
South Asian Games medalists in field hockey